Heward is a village in the Canadian province of Saskatchewan within the Rural Municipality of Tecumseh No. 65 and Census Division No. 1. The village is located along highway 33 in southeastern Saskatchewan. Even though it has under 50 people it still maintains a post office, rink, and hall that all service the farming community. In 1977  Prairie Trails and Tales: Heward Saskatchewan 1900-1976 was written by Muriel Dempsey.

History 
Heward incorporated as a village on November 21, 1904.

Bryce Dickey, born in Heward in 1908, wrote an extensive history of the village which is published in the summer 2007 issue of Folklore magazine. He describes how "Reverend Pike, an Englishman and a bachelor decided to build a new church and it was to be the same design and construction as one in England that had been lost to the sea due to coastal erosion." The chimes and font were from this church and were installed in the Heward church. When the church was finally closed, the chimes and font were sent to a church in Regina.

Demographics 

See also

 List of communities in Saskatchewan
 Villages of Saskatchewan

References

Villages in Saskatchewan
Tecumseh No. 65, Saskatchewan
Division No. 1, Saskatchewan